Zaborsko  is a village in the administrative district of Gmina Warnice, within Pyrzyce County, West Pomeranian Voivodeship, in north-western Poland.

See also 

 History of Pomerania

References

Zaborsko